The Australian water dragon (Intellagama lesueurii), which includes the eastern water dragon (Intellagama lesueurii lesueurii ) and the Gippsland water dragon (Intellagama lesueurii howittii ) subspecies, is an arboreal agamid species native to eastern Australia from Victoria northwards to Queensland. There may be a small introduced population on the south-east coast of South Australia.
The Gippsland Water Dragon is generally the more southern of the two species and the more cold adapted and heat sensitive.
Visually distinguishing the Gippsland Water Dragon from the Eastern Water Dragon is relatively easy, as long as their skin is reasonably clean and not stained from the water, as identification of the two subspecies depends largely on observable differences in colours and patterns.

The Gippsland Water Dragon may be distinguished by its green-blue colour, especially during the breeding season, when this overall colouration is quite distinct. Another key difference is the absence of a prominent dark stripe behind the eye in the Gippsland Water Dragon, which is characteristic of the Eastern Water Dragon. The gular region of the two subspecies is also quite different, with Intellagama l. howittii having orange-yellow streaked with darker striping, which is sometimes quite striking, particularly in mature males, whereas Intellagama l. lesueurii typically has a pale, unmarked throat that is sometimes immaculate white in mature males. The belly and chest of Intellagama l. howittii are also quite different to Intellagama l. lesueurii, usually being blackish green, especially in mature males, and the limbs are often quite dark, sometimes even black. Whereas in Intellagama l. lesueurii the chest and belly are usually bright to deep red, particularly in mature males. Intellagama l. lesueurii also have relatively strong dark transverse bars across the back, whereas these dark bars are often much reduced in the Gippsland Water Dragon.

Etymology
The specific name, lesueurii, is in honor of French naturalist Charles Alexandre Lesueur.

Taxonomy and systematics

The species was first described by John Edward Gray in 1831 as Lophura lesueurii, from a specimen collected by Lesueur & Péron at "Parramatta" or "Port Jackson". Gray listed three species of Lophura: Cuvier's (Lophura Cuvierii Gray), Lesueur's (Lophura Lesueurii Gray), and beautiful (Lophura Concinna Gray, Physignathus Concinnus Cuvier).

In 1845, Gray separated Physignathus (P. concinnus & P. Lesueurii) from Lophura (L. amboinensis & L. Shawii). The Australian water dragon remained in Physignathus along with the Asian water dragon P. cocincinus until Wells and Wellington published the genus Intellagama in 1985. 

The subspecies howitii was described by Frederick McCoy in 1884 as "the Gippsland water lizard". According to his description, it differs from the Queensland subspecies in the proportions of the head and the supra-ocular scales. Its sub-specific epithet commemorates geologist and magistrate Alfred William Howitt, who collected three specimens from the upper reaches of the Buchan River and sent them to McCoy. Two of the specimens cannot be located, the third is D1822 in the collection of the National Museum of Victoria, which was designated the lectotype by Coventry in 1970. Hoser treats I. howitii as a separate species rather than a subspecies.

Hoser (2020) proposed a third species: the Northern water dragon Intellagama wellsandwellingtonorum. The North Queensland Intellagama population, which extends from Cairns in the south through the wet tropical zone of Townsville to Cooktown in the north, is asserted to be allopatric with the mid-latitude population from Rockhampton south into New South Wales. The southern population ranges from Kiama south to Victoria. The northern dragons have smaller spines, "a series of 5–7 deep yellow, to yellowish-orange squarish to diamond-shped blotches along the mid flanks", and other colouration differences.

Description
Australian water dragons have long powerful limbs and claws for climbing, a long muscular laterally-compressed tail for swimming, and prominent nuchal and vertebral crests. (A nuchal crest is a central row of spikes at the base of the head. These spikes continue down the spine, getting smaller as they reach the base of the tail.)

Including their tails, which comprise about two-thirds of their total length, adult females grow to about 60 cm (2 feet) long, and adult males can grow slightly longer than one metre (39 inches) and weigh about 1 kg. Males show bolder colouration and have larger heads than females. Colour is less distinct in juveniles.

Species variation
The Australian water dragon is the only species of the genus Intellagama.

There are two subspecies; Intellagama lesueurii lesueurii (eastern water dragon) and Intellagama lesueurii howitti (Gippsland water dragon). Intellagama lesueurii lesueurii tends towards white, yellow and red on the throat and possesses a dark band behind its eye; Intellagama lesueurii howitti lacks this and instead has dark bands on either side of its throat, which is blotched with yellow, orange, or blue. Both subspecies are light greenish grey in overall colour with black bands running across their back, tail and legs. The water dragon can slowly change skin colour to aid its camouflage. The skin will shed during periods of growth.

Behaviour

Australian water dragons are extremely shy in the wild, but readily adapt to continual human presence in suburban parks and gardens. They are fast runners and strong climbers. When faced with a potential predator, they seek cover in thick vegetation, or drop from an overhanging branch into water. They are able to swim totally submerged, and rest on the bottom of shallow creeks or lakes for up to 90 minutes, to avoid detection.

Both males and females display typical agamid behaviour such as basking, arm-waving and head-bobbing. Fast arm-waving signals dominance, while slow arm-waving signals submission. Males are territorial, and in areas of higher population density, males exhibit displays of aggression toward other males including posturing, chasing and fighting.

Breeding
Australian water dragons living in cooler Australian climates hibernate over winter. The nest is usually in sandy or soft soil, in an area open to sun. When the mother has laid the eggs, she backfills the chamber with soil and scatters loose debris over it. Australian water dragons exhibit temperature dependent sex determination; the sex of the hatchlings is determined by the temperature of the nest site.

When the young are born they stay near the entrance of the burrow for some time before leaving home. When they finally leave the nest, they tend to group together away from the adult population.

Habitat

As its name suggests, the Australian water dragon is associated with water and is semi-aquatic. It can be found near creeks, rivers, lakes, and other water bodies that have basking sites such as overhanging branches or rocks in open or filtered sun. The species is very common in the rainforest section of Brisbane Botanic Gardens, Mount Coot-tha in Queensland, and a monument has been built to them there.

There are anecdotal reports of a small colony living on the Sixth Creek in the Forest Range area of South Australia, hundreds of kilometers outside their natural range, which were probably introduced there during the 1980s by a local reptile enthusiast.

Predators, threats and diet
Australian water dragons are prey to carnivorous birds, snakes, cats, dogs, and foxes. Nestlings and smaller juvenile water dragons are vulnerable to predation by kookaburras, currawongs, butcherbirds and other carnivorous birds. They are also prone to becoming road kill due to the attraction of warm bitumen and concrete for basking.
The Australian water dragon's diet depends on its size. Juveniles and yearlings tend to feed on spiders and small insects such as ants, crickets, and caterpillars. When they get bigger, so does their prey. An adult diet includes small rodents, such as baby mice, other reptiles, frogs, fish, crabs, yabbies, molluscs, worms and eggs, although insects are still the most commonly consumed. Types of vegetation reportedly consumed include figs, lilly-pilly fruits, berries, and other fruits and flowers.

Gallery

Notes

References

Further reading
Boulenger GA. 1885. Catalogue of the Lizards in the British Museum (Natural History). Second Edition. Volume I. ... Agamidæ ... London: Trustees of the British Museum (Natural History). (Taylor and Francis, printers). xii + 436 pp. + Plates I-XXXII. (Physignathus lesueurii, pp. 398–399).

External links

 Video of male Gippsland Water Dragons fighting on Youtube
 Australian National Botanic Gardens Research
 
 
 
 
 

Agamidae
Agamid lizards of Australia
Reptiles described in 1831
Taxa named by John Edward Gray